McKinley Mine was an open-pit coal mine, owned by Chevron Corporation, and located in McKinley County, New Mexico. The mine closed in 2009.

References 

Coal mines in the United States
Geography of McKinley County, New Mexico
Mining in New Mexico